Hérouvillette is a commune in the Calvados department in the Normandy region in northwestern France.

Population

Places and monuments 
 Hérouvillette: Church of the "Nativité-de-Notre-Dame" (XIV).
 Sainte-Honorine-la-Chardronnette: Church of Sainte-Honorine (XVIII).
 Lavoir on the "Aiguillon".

See also
Communes of the Calvados department

References

Communes of Calvados (department)
Calvados communes articles needing translation from French Wikipedia